The Yellowknife Administration district, was a political management jurisdiction representing Yellowknife, Northwest Territories in Canada. 

The district was created by Federal legislation in 1939 to encompass lands within a 3.5-mile radius of the town centre. Its primary functions were to create a Trustee Council that would represent civic issues in Yellowknife. The issues included liquor control, sanitation, land surveys, schools, and taxation. The Trustee Council was partly appointed and partly elected from a pool of local businessmen. This system continued until 1953 when the first fully elected Municipal Town Council was organized and Yellowknife civic affairs were no longer managed by the Federal government.

References

Former electoral districts of Northwest Territories